Percy Downing Godfrey (February 5, 1899 – March 31, 1930) was an American football coach and college athletics administrator.  He served as the head football coach at Southeastern State Teachers College—now known as Southeastern Oklahoma State University—from 1923 to 1925, compiling a record of 16–9–3.  Godfrey died on March 31, 1930.

Head coaching record

College

References

External links
 

1899 births
1930 deaths
Southeastern Oklahoma State Savage Storm athletic directors
Southeastern Oklahoma State Savage Storm football coaches
High school football coaches in Minnesota
Sportspeople from Saint Paul, Minnesota